The May 2009 Southern Midwest Derecho was an extreme progressive derecho and mesoscale convective vortex (MCV) event that struck southeastern Kansas, southern Missouri, and southwestern Illinois on May 8, 2009. Thirty-nine tornadoes, including two of EF3 strength on the Enhanced Fujita Scale, were reported in addition to high non-tornadic winds associated with the derecho and MCV. Due to the abnormal shape of the storm on radar and the extremely strong winds, many called this an "inland hurricane." A new class of storm, the Super Derecho, has been used to describe this event after analysis in 2010. Embedded supercells produced hail up to baseball size in southern Missouri, a rare event in a derecho. This derecho was the last of a series of derechos that occurred at the beginning of May.

Meteorological synopsis

A complex of thunderstorms formed over northwestern Kansas overnight May 7 and into the early morning hours of May 8, before moving into south-central Kansas, where greater moisture and stronger upper-level winds were present.  The cluster of storms began to evolve into a more organized derecho near Hutchinson, Kansas, where National Weather Service damage surveys found winds greater than  started, then continued through southern Missouri.

While in southwestern Missouri, the derecho began to change; supercells began to embed within the line, and a wake low began to form in conjunction with a bookend vortex on the northern end of the derecho. As the derecho entered southeastern Missouri, the initial line associated began to weaken, but the MCV became increasingly pronounced on the northern end.

Many experts and NWS meteorologists considered this to be one of the worst derechos and MCVs in the past decade. Local National Weather Service offices in Springfield, Missouri, and Paducah, Kentucky, also issued strongly worded severe thunderstorm warnings, with precautionary statements similar to those used in tornado warnings.

As both the initial squall line and MCV weakened, very little severe weather was reported between southern Illinois and central Kentucky.  However, as the weakening squall line encountered higher instability and more favorable upper-level winds, the line split into several supercells in a process still not fully understood; these storms produced several tornadoes in central Kentucky, eastern Tennessee, southwestern Virginia, and northwestern North Carolina.  While no longer producing severe weather itself, the MCV continued to enhance thunderstorms early the next morning across southeastern Virginia.

Other similar events

Despite its at first seeming extremely rare, further research has found that similar storms have occurred previously.  One case, which occurred in North Carolina on April 15, 1999, produced a killer tornado and a  wind gust, although this may have been associated with a tornado.
Another heavily studied event in northern Pennsylvania on July 21, 2003, also resulted in several tornadoes.

Confirmed tornadoes

May 8 event

Effects

Kansas and southwestern Missouri

The initial squall line formed in central Kansas, to the northwest of Hutchinson.  In Hutchinson, several airplanes were flipped at a local airport, and 21,000 people were left without power. A woman was killed in New Albany, Kansas, when her mobile home was blown forty feet off of its foundation.  National Weather Service survey teams found that winds reached  in the area, which also resulted in the destruction of a church and the town's post office, in addition to damaging several homes. A total of 130 buildings were damaged in Cherokee, Kansas, including a high school gymnasium. Schools in several counties closed for the day, and a twenty-mile stretch of the Kansas Turnpike was closed for an hour due to flooding.

The derecho continued to intensify as it reached southwestern Missouri, where the storm forced several television stations in Joplin, Missouri, off the air after their transmission towers were downed; one station's tower landed on its studios.  Numerous schools were damaged throughout the Springfield, Missouri, area, including a roof collapse at the Fair Grove High School, resulting in three injuries to students. There were numerous reports of tree and roof damage throughout Springfield, prompting some business to close. Drury University canceled some morning classes. A total of 346 buildings suffered some damage in Greene County, Missouri, and four people were injured, but none required hospitalization.

Southeastern Missouri and southwestern Illinois

As the initial line weakened, the mesoscale convective vortex on the northern end began to strengthen and separate from the squall line.  A long-lived supercell formed within the MCV in Madison County, Missouri, producing hail up to baseball size and a few tornadoes, in addition to the more widespread, damaging, straight-line winds throughout the area.

Numerous trees were knocked over from Shannon County, Missouri—near the Current and Jacks Fork rivers, in the Ozark National Scenic Riverways preserve—northward through the Mark Twain National Forest and other forested public conservation lands.  Devastation was especially pronounced in the area west of Ironton, Missouri, around the popular Johnson's Shut-Ins State Park and the Bell Mountain Wilderness area. Over 50 miles of the long-distance Ozark Trail were damaged, requiring many months of repairs to rehabilitate.

As the MCV crossed the Mississippi River and entered into more populated areas, it strengthened greatly, while it nearly separated from the initial line.  Numerous buildings were severely damaged or destroyed throughout southern Illinois. Immediately after the MCV struck, Carbondale was reported to be virtually impassable due to the amount of debris on roadways. Marion, Murphysboro, Grand Tower, Johnston City, Herrin, Energy, and Carterville, Illinois, declared curfews and states of emergency due to power outages and the massive amounts of damage caused by the storms. Some of these cities were even left without water due to the power outages.  In the city of Carbondale, damage was estimated at US$3,000,000, excluding damage at Southern Illinois University. Officials deemed 34 buildings a "total loss" and reported that 3,000 trees were felled throughout the city.

Preliminary estimates placed damages at Southern Illinois University in excess of US$5,000,000. Numerous buildings on campus sustained roof damage, and nearly 100 windows were blown out of residence halls. Due to infrastructure damage from the storm, most communication by land line and mobile phone was reported to be impossible. In Carterville, Illinois, officials found 17 buildings to be a total loss. The city's public works garage was shifted off its foundation, and the police station sustained damage. In Franklin County, Illinois, 13 buildings were deemed to be beyond repair; damage assessments found that 184 buildings received some kind of damage from the storm. At one point, 68,000 people were left without power in southern Illinois alone, prompting unusual methods to restore power, such as using helicopters to clear debris and position power poles.

Elsewhere

As the squall line continued east, it began to break apart into separate supercells; several of these supercells produced tornadoes.  An EF-3 tornado touched down in eastern Garrard County before tracking into southern Madison County, Kentucky; two people were killed in this tornado, five others were injured, and 150 homes were damaged. All of the injuries and deaths occurred in one mobile home near the intersection of Kentucky Route 1295 and Kentucky Route 52 in southern Madison County.  Most of the damaged homes were in a subdivision in the Waco area, just north of the Blue Grass Army Depot. One mobile phone bill from a damaged house was carried  before coming to rest on the property of a National Weather Service employee.

Flooding
The squall line and associated convection resulted in significant flooding south of St. Louis, Missouri and in eastern Kentucky.

In Rice County, high waters washed out several small bridges and low water crossings and damaged concrete structures, leaving roughly $340,000 in losses. In some places, rainfall reached  within a 30-minute span, leading to widespread street flooding. Up to ten drivers required rescue after their cars stalled in the flood waters. Flowing water over the Kansas Turnpike forced officials to shut down a  stretch of the highway for over an hour. One person needed to be rescued in Lyon County after driving into a flooded street. Barricades were set up in some areas of the county due to rising waters. In Reno County, four bridges sustained severe flood damage and another was destroyed. Damages to the bridges amounted to $500,000. In some places, schools canceled classes due to the heavy rainfall.

Along Missouri Route 89, flood waters reached a depth of some 2 feet (60 cm.). Numerous side roads throughout several counties were closed due to flooding. In Washington County, the Big River overflowed its banks and inundated a nearby highway. A water rescue took place near the town of Bloomsdale. Some of the most severe flooding took place in the town of Doniphan, in Ripley County, where  of rain fell in a 24-hour span. Ten people needed to be evacuated from their homes due to rising waters. The county courthouse and local high school sustained major water damage. Several other structures in the area were also inundated during the storm, and two people needed to be rescued from their vehicle, which was stalled in waist-deep water. In Laclede County, severe flooding washed out low-lying roads and drainage culverts.

Aftermath
On July 2, 2009, President Barack Obama declared a major disaster in Franklin, Gallatin, Jackson, Randolph, Saline, and Williamson counties in Illinois; Dolph A. Diemont was named as the Federal Emergency Management Agency coordinating officer for the area. FEMA also stated that further disaster declarations were possible as requested by the state.  Missouri Governor Jay Nixon requested federal assistance for 46 counties in Missouri; damage in those counties was estimated to exceed US$48,700,000. On November 30, 2009, Senator Claire McCaskill announced that the State Emergency Management Agency of Missouri would receive $1,228,208.25 in federal grant money to cover the state's costs in "administering and managing" FEMA Public Assistance grants.  In addition, it was announced that the Citizens Electric Corporation would receive a $1,395,201.46 grant to offset costs incurred in repairing infrastructure in Perry, Sainte Genevieve, and Cape Girardeau counties.

See also

Tornadoes of 2009
List of North American tornadoes and tornado outbreaks
May 2009 derecho series
List of derecho events

References

External links
 National Weather Service Paducah, KY summary
 National Weather Service Springfield, MO summary
 National Weather Service Saint Louis, MO summary
 National Weather Service Wichita, KS summary
 National Weather Service Louisville, KY summary
 National Weather Service Blacksburg, VA summary
 National Weather Service Morristown, TN summary
 NBC Chicago slideshow of damage in Carbondale

F3 tornadoes
Tornadoes in Missouri
Tornadoes in Illinois
Tornadoes in Kentucky
Tornadoes in Tennessee
Tornadoes in Virginia
Tornadoes in North Carolina
Tornadoes of 2009
2009 natural disasters in the United States
Derechos in the United States
Articles containing video clips
May 2009 events in the United States